Name, age, country of citizenship at birth, subsequent country of citizenship (if applicable), reason for notability, cause of death (if known), and reference.

September 2009

1
Dick Berg, 87, American screenwriter and television producer, fall.
Jake Drake-Brockman, 53, British musician (Echo & the Bunnymen) and sound recordist, motorcycle accident.
Jock Buchanan, 74, Scottish footballer (Hibernian).
Aubrey Buxton, Baron Buxton of Alsa, 91, British television executive and conservationist.
Carlos Alberto Menezes Direito, 66, Brazilian judge (Supreme Federal Court) (2007–2009), pancreatic cancer.
Gulab Mohanlal Hiranandani, 78, Indian admiral.
Jang Jin-young, 35, South Korean actress, stomach cancer.
Wycliffe Johnson, 47, Jamaican Reggae musician and composer, heart failure.
Erich Kunzel, 74, American conductor (Cincinnati Pops Orchestra), cancer.
Wayne E. Meyer, 83, American Rear-Admiral, Aegis Combat System manager, heart failure.
Francis Rogallo, 97, American aeronautical inventor (Rogallo wing).
John Stephens, 43, American football player (New England Patriots), NFL Offensive Rookie of the Year (1988), traffic collision.
Alexis Tioseco, 28, Filipino-born Canadian film critic, shot.
Sir Oliver Wright, 88, British diplomat.

2

Guy Babylon, 52, American musician (Elton John band), heart attack.
Brian Boshier, 77, British cricketer.
Jon Eydmann, 41, British band manager (Suede), heart attack.
Donald Hamilton Fraser, 80, British painter.
Bill Hefner, 79, American politician, member of the House of Representatives for North Carolina (1975–1999), brain aneurysm.
Tibor Kristóf, 67, Hungarian voice actor, Hungarian voice of Sean Connery, Morgan Freeman and Darth Vader.
Abdullah Laghmani, 40s, Afghan Secret Service chief, bomb blast.
Mr Percival, 33, Australian pelican, animal actor (Storm Boy), natural causes.
John Poole, 82, British sculptor.
Christian Poveda, 54, French photojournalist and documentary filmmaker, shot.
Y. S. Rajasekhara Reddy, 60, Indian politician, Chief Minister of Andhra Pradesh (since 2004), helicopter crash.
Mohamed Alí Seineldín, 75, Argentine military commander and putschist (Carapintadas).
Robert Spinrad, 77, American computer pioneer, director of the Palo Alto Research Center, amyotrophic lateral sclerosis.
Ismael Valenzuela, 74, American jockey, after long illness.
Jeffrey Wernick, 56, American animation executive (DIC Animation City) and sports agent.

3
Nicola Chapman, Baroness Chapman, 48, British peer, member of the House of Lords, brittle bone disease.
Hulda Regehr Clark, 80, Canadian alternative medicine practitioner.
Christine D'haen, 85, Belgian poet.
Giovanni Melis Fois, 92, Italian Bishop of Nuoro (1970–1992).
Caro Jones, 86, American casting director (Rocky, The Karate Kid, Green Acres), multiple myeloma.
Edith Kaplan, 85, American neuropsychologist.
Alec MacLachlan, 30, British hostage in Iraq (death confirmed on this date).
Ronald Sarre, 77, Australian cricketer.
Yukhym Shkolnykov, 70, Ukrainian association football coach.

4
Buddy Blattner, 89, American sportscaster, baseball and table tennis player, complications from lung cancer.
Iain Cuthbertson, 79, British actor (Gorillas in the Mist, The Railway Children).
Allan Ekelund, 91, Swedish film producer, collaborator with Ingmar Bergman.
Guy Guillabert, 78, French Olympic bronze medal-winning (1956) rower.
Skip Miller, 62, American music industry executive, president of Motown Records, heart attack.
Franz Olah, 99, Austrian politician, Interior Minister (1963–1964).
Carl Reindel, 74, American actor (Bullitt, Tora! Tora! Tora!, The Andromeda Strain).
Keith Waterhouse, 80, British author and playwright (Billy Liar), natural causes.
Bill Welch, 68, American politician, mayor of State College, Pennsylvania, complications after leg surgery.

5
Gani Fawehinmi, 71, Nigerian lawyer and human rights activist, lung cancer.
Carl Hovde, 82, American professor, Dean during the Columbia University protests of 1968, lung cancer.
Mickie Jones, 56, American bassist (Angel), liver cancer.
Jesse Mahelona, 26, American football player (Tennessee Titans), traffic collision.
Richard Merkin, 70, American artist.
Saifur Rahman, 77, Bangladeshi politician, longest-serving Finance Minister, traffic collision.
Ron Raikes, 61, American politician, Nebraska state senator (1998–2008), farm accident.
Richard D. Robinson, 88, American educator.
Charlie Waller, 87, American football coach.

6
Christopher John Banda, 36, Malawian footballer.
Harcharan Singh Brar, 90, Indian politician, Chief Minister of Punjab (1995–1996).
Vanja Drach, 77, Croatian actor.
Gerhart Friedlander, 93, German-born American nuclear chemist, coronary disease.
Helgi Hóseasson, 89, Icelandic activist.
Jose Francisco Fuentes, 43, Mexican politician, shot.
Catherine Gaskin, 80, Irish-born Australian novelist, ovarian cancer.
Nada Iveljić, 79, Croatian writer.
John Merino, 42, Ecuadorian colonel, head of presidential security for Rafael Correa, swine flu.
David J. Ritchie, 58, American game designer.
Sim, 83, French comic actor. ′
Tatyana Ustinova, 96, Russian geologist.
Stephen White, 81, Irish Gaelic footballer, member of Ireland Team of the Century, after short illness.
Sir David Glyndwr Tudor Williams, 78, British academic, Vice-Chancellor of the University of Cambridge (1989–1996), cancer.

7
Medea Chakhava, 88, Georgian theatre and film actress.
Frank Coghlan, Jr., 93, American silent film actor.
Norman Curtis, 84, English football player and manager (Sheffield Wednesday, Doncaster Rovers).
John T. Elson, 78, American religion editor (Time).
Eddie Locke, 79, American jazz drummer.
Fred Mills, 74, Canadian musician (Canadian Brass), traffic collision.
Ra'anan Naim, 73, Israeli politician, Member of Knesset (1981–1984).
Colin Sharp, 56, British musician and writer, brain haemorrhage.
Paul Lê Dac Trong, 91, Vietnamese Bishop of Hanoi (1994–2006).
Christos Vartzakis, 98, Greek athlete.

8
Aleksandr Aksyonov, 85, Belarusian PM of Byelorussian SSR (1978–1983), Soviet Ambassador to Poland (1983–1986).
Army Archerd, 90, American entertainment columnist (Variety), malignant mesothelioma.
Ray Barrett, 82, Australian film, television and theatre actor, brain hemorrhage.
Aage Bohr, 87, Danish physicist, winner of Nobel Prize in Physics (1975).
Mike Bongiorno, 85, American-born Italian television presenter, heart failure.
Rica Erickson, 101, Australian naturalist, artist and author.
Henry Sheldon Fitch, 99, American herpetologist.
Rogelio Borja Flores, 74, Filipino sports writer, respiratory failure.
Annie Le, 24, American graduate student, homicide.
Kyle Woodring, 42, American drummer (Survivor), apparent suicide by hanging.

9
Kevin Carmody, 84, Australian cricket umpire.
Eric Davidson, 94, Canadian blind mechanic, survivor of the Halifax Explosion.
Anthony G. Evans, 66, British scientist.
Léon Glovacki, 81, French footballer, played in 1954 FIFA World Cup.
James Krenov, 88, American cabinetmaker.
Stanley Cornwell Lewis, 103, British painter and illustrator.
Steve Mann, 66, American songwriter and guitarist.
Frank Mazzuca, 87, Canadian businessman, mayor of Capreol, Ontario.
Sultan Munadi, 32, Afghan journalist, translator and correspondent (The New York Times), shot.
Andrzej Śliwiński, 70, Polish Bishop of Elbląg (1992–2003).

10
John Asquith, 77, English cricketer.
Frank Batten, 82, American businessman, founder of The Weather Channel.
Lou Bender, 99, American basketball pioneer who popularized the sport in New York City, cancer.
Kerry Brown, 51, Canadian professional wrestler, liver failure.
Lisle Carter, Jr, 83, American administrator, complications from pneumonia.
Lyn Hamilton, 65, Canadian author, cancer.
Sam Hinton, 92, American folk singer and marine biologist.
Margaret Holmes, 100, Australian peace activist.
Robert H. Miller, 90, American jurist, Chief Justice of the Kansas Supreme Court (1988–1990).
Gertrude Noone, 110, American supercentenarian, oldest person in Connecticut and world's oldest military veteran.
Patricia Robinson, 79, Trinidadian economist, First Lady (1997–2003), wife of A. N. R. Robinson.
Yoshifumi Tajima, 91, Japanese actor in Kaiju films, esophageal cancer.
Tony Thornton, 49, American professional boxer, injuries sustained in a motorcycle accident.

11
Sarane Alexandrian, 82, French art historian and philosopher.
*Juan Almeida Bosque, 82, Cuban politician, Vice President of the Council of State, cardiac arrest.
James E. Bromwell, 89, American politician, Representative for Iowa (1961–1965).
Jim Carroll, 60, American author (The Basketball Diaries), poet and musician, heart attack.
Mool Chand Chowhan, 82, Indian sports official.
Pierre Cossette, 85, Canadian television producer, brought the Grammy Awards to television.
Larry Gelbart, 81, American comedy writer (M*A*S*H) and blogger (The Huffington Post), cancer.
Bob Greenberg, 75, American record executive, stroke.
Zakes Mokae, 75, South African-born American actor (Gross Anatomy), complications from a stroke.
Georgios Papoulias, 82, Greek politician and diplomat, Foreign Minister (1989, 1990), suicide.
John Pattison, 92, New Zealand World War II pilot.
*Henny van Schoonhoven, 39, Dutch footballer, cancer.
Crystal Lee Sutton, 68, American union organizer, inspiration for Norma Rae, brain cancer.
Felicia Tang, 31, Singaporean-born American actress and model, suffocated.
Yoshito Usui, 51, Japanese manga artist (Crayon Shin-chan), mountaineering accident.

12
Thabet bin Laden, 49, Saudi businessman and patriarch, brother of al-Qaeda leader Osama bin Laden.
Norman Borlaug, 95, American agronomist and humanitarian, Nobel Peace Prize laureate (1970), cancer.
Dominik Brunner, 50, German businessman and manager, blunt trauma.
Jeanne Clemson, 87, American theatre director, actress and educator, Parkinson's disease.
Raj Singh Dungarpur, 73, Indian cricket player and administrator.
George Eckstein, 81, American television writer and producer (The Fugitive), lung cancer.
Edward Gelsthorpe, 88, American marketing executive.
Alfred Gottschalk, 79, German-born American President of Hebrew Union College, Reform Judaism leader, traffic collision.
William Hoffman, 84, American novelist.
Shah Abdul Karim, 93, Bangladeshi musician, respiratory problems.
Jack Kramer, 88, American tennis player, cancer.
Armando Manhiça, 66, Portuguese international footballer.
Brian Mier, 74, Australian politician, member of the Victorian Legislative Council for Waverley (1982–1996).
Antônio Olinto, 90, Brazilian writer, multiple organ failure.
Danny Pang, 42, Taiwanese-born American hedge fund manager.
Willy Ronis, 99, French photographer.
T. R. Satishchandran, 80, Indian Administrative Service officer.
Fred Sherman, 86, American economist and business commentator.
Lawrence B. Slobodkin, 81, American ecologist.
Bill Sparkman, 51, American substitute teacher and census worker, hanged.

13
Philip Aziz, 86, Canadian artist, cancer.
Felix Bowness, 87, British actor (Hi-de-Hi!) 
Paul Burke, 83, American actor (Naked City), leukemia.
Malcolm Casadaban, 60, American molecular genetics professor, plague.
Lonny Frey, 99, American baseball player, oldest living MLB All-Star.
Arnold Laven, 87, American film and television director (The Rifleman, The Big Valley), pneumonia.
Paul Shirtliff, 46, English footballer (Sheffield Wednesday, Northampton Town), cancer.
Sarah E. Wright, 80, American novelist, complications from cancer.

14
Keith Floyd, 65, British chef, heart attack.
Henry Gibson, 73, American actor (Laugh-In, Boston Legal), cancer.
Bobby Graham, 69, British session drummer, stomach cancer.
*Jing Shuping, 91, Chinese businessman, founder of Minsheng Bank.
Mike Leyland, 68, Australian travel documentary host (Leyland Brothers), complications of Parkinson's disease.
Ralph S. Moore, 102, American horticulturist, natural causes.
Saleh Ali Saleh Nabhan, c. 30, Kenyan terrorist, airstrike.
Jody Powell, 65, American White House Press Secretary for President Jimmy Carter, heart attack.
John Rarick, 85, American politician, Representative for Louisiana (1967–1975), cancer.
Darren Sutherland, 27, Irish boxer, 2008 Olympic bronze medalist, suicide by hanging.
Patrick Swayze, 57, American actor (Dirty Dancing, Red Dawn, The Outsiders), pancreatic cancer.
Lily Tembo, 27, Zambian musician, songwriter and journalist, complications from gastritis.
Titus, 35, African silverback gorilla.
Bartholomew Yu Chengti, 90, Chinese clandestine Roman Catholic prelate.
Elio Zagato, 88, Italian car designer.

15
Nicu Constantin, 70, Romanian actor.
George Crumbley, 86, American founder of the Peach Bowl.
Fred Cusick, 90, American sports commentator (Boston Bruins), complications from bladder cancer.
Leon Eisenberg, 87, American child psychiatrist, prostate cancer.
Tommy Greenhough, 77, British cricketer.
*Troy Kennedy Martin, 77, British screenwriter (Z-Cars, Edge of Darkness, The Italian Job), liver cancer.
Michael Knox, 48, American co-founder of Park Place Productions, producer of John Madden Football, colon cancer.
Espiridion Laxa, 79, Filipino independent film producer, prostate cancer.
Gerald Lestz, 95, American columnist and author, founder of the Demuth Museum.
Vladimír Padrta, 56, Slovak Olympic basketball player.
Kallie Reyneke, 87, South African Olympic racewalker.
Trevor Rhone, 69, Jamaican playwright, heart attack.

16
Brian Barron, 69, British journalist and war correspondent, cancer.
Timothy Bateson, 83, British actor.
Myles Brand, 67, American NCAA president, pancreatic cancer.
W. Horace Carter, 88, American newspaper website, 1953 Pulitzer Prize winner, heart attack.
Monte Clark, 72, American football player and coach (Detroit Lions), cancer.
Luciano Emmer, 91, Italian film director (Three Girls from Rome).
Sotero Laurel, 90, Filipino politician, Senator (1986–1992), President Pro Tempore (1990–1991).
John Littlewood, 78, British chess player
Lori Mai, 31, German-American folk rock singer, amyotrophic lateral sclerosis.
Ernst Märzendorfer, 88, Austrian conductor.
Julian Niemczyk, 89, American Ambassador to Czechoslovakia (1986–1989), cardiac arrest.
Filip Nikolic, 35, French singer and actor, drug overdose.
Steve Romanik, 85, American football player (Chicago Bears).
Melvin Simon, 82, American shopping mall developer (Simon Property Group), producer (Porky's), Indiana Pacers owner.
Mary Travers, 72, American singer (Peter, Paul and Mary), leukemia.
Dorothy Wellman, 95, American dancer and actress, widow of William Wellman.

17
Tommy Burnett, 67, American politician, Tennessee House of Representatives (1970–1990).
Virginia Chadwick, 64, Australian politician, cancer.
Frank Deasy, 49, Irish Emmy Award-winning screenwriter (Prime Suspect: The Final Act), liver cancer.
Dick Durock, 72, American actor and stuntman (Swamp Thing), pancreatic cancer.
Bernie Fuchs, 76, American illustrator, esophageal cancer.
Dick Hoover, 79, American professional bowler.
Randy Johnson, 65, American football quarterback (Atlanta Falcons).
Leon Kirchner, 90, American Pulitzer Prize-winning composer, heart failure.
Bob Kowalkowski, 65, American football player and coach (Detroit Lions).
Robert Searcy, 88, American member of the Tuskegee Airmen, colorectal cancer.
Noordin Mohammad Top, 41, Malaysian terrorist, shot.
Geoff Williamson, 86, Australian Olympic bronze medal-winning (1952) rower.

18
Peter Denyer, 62, British actor (Please Sir!).
James Donnewald, 84, American politician, Illinois Treasurer (1983–1987).
Doug Fisher, 89, Canadian journalist and politician, MP for Port Arthur (1957–1965).
Pearl Hackney, 92, British actress, widow of Eric Barker.
Mahlon Hoagland, 87, American biochemist.
Irving Kristol, 89, American neoconservative advocate and editor (The Public Interest), lung cancer.
Natalia Shvedova, 92, Russian lexicologist.
John J. Wild, 95, American physician, co-developer of ultrasound use in cancer detection.

19
Gabriel Beaudry, 82, Canadian Olympic rower.
Willy Breinholst, 91, Danish author.
Alan Deyermond, 77, British hispanist.
Arthur Ferrante, 88, American pianist (Ferrante & Teicher), natural causes.
Stevie Gray, 42, British footballer (Aberdeen FC, 1983–1990).
Víctor Israel, 80, Spanish actor.
Monty Kaser, 67, American professional golfer, prostate cancer.
Milton Meltzer, 94, American historian and author, esophageal cancer.
Maurizio Montalbini, 56, Italian sociologist and caver, heart failure.
Elizaveta Mukasei, 97, Russian Soviet-era spy, wife of Mikhail Mukasei.
Jose Antonio Ortega Bonet, 79, Cuban-born businessman and philanthropist, founder of Sazón Goya Food Company, cancer.
Roc Raida, 37, American DJ (The X-Ecutioners), cardiac arrest after a spinal cord injury.
Joseph-Marie Sardou, 86, French archbishop Emeritus of Monaco.
Eduard Zimmermann, 80, German journalist and television presenter.

20
Mario Bertolo, 80, French cyclist.
Freddy Bienstock, 86, American music website (Carlin America).
Herman Córdoba, 19, Colombian footballer, traffic collision.
Bertil Gärtner, 84, Swedish Lutheran bishop of Gothenburg (1970–1991).
John Hart, 91, American actor (The Lone Ranger).
Ken Hough, 80, New Zealand cricketer and footballer.
Yusuf Khan, Pakistani actor, cardiac arrest.
Booker Moore, 50, American football player (Buffalo Bills), heart attack.
Bayo Ohu, 45, Nigerian journalist and news editor (The Guardian), shot.
Eddy Prentice, 88, New Zealand cricketer.

21
Robert Ginty, 60, American actor and director, cancer.
Michael Lockett, 29, British soldier, improvised explosive device.
Miroslav Stefan Marusyn, 85, Ukrainian archbishop, Secretary Emeritus of the Congregation for the Oriental Churches.
Piers Merchant, 58, British politician, MP for Newcastle upon Tyne Central (1983–1987) and Beckenham (1992–1997), cancer.
Parviz Meshkatian, 54, Iranian musician and composer, cardiac arrest.
Junzo Shono, 88, Japanese author, member of the Japan Art Academy.
Sula Wolff, 85, British child psychiatrist.

22
Marco Achilli, 60, Italian footballer.
Manuel Bermejo Hernández, 73, Spanish politician, MP for Cáceres.
Kole Čašule, 88, Macedonian writer.
Edward Delaney, 79, Irish sculptor.
Olaf Dufseth, 91, Norwegian Olympic Nordic combined and cross-country skier.
Andrea Maltarolli, 46, Brazilian telenovela screenwriter (Beleza Pura), cancer.
Bruce McPhee, 82, Australian race car driver, won Hardie Ferodo 500 (1968).
Dirce Migliaccio, 76, Brazilian actress, pneumonia.
Summer Squall, 22, American thoroughbred racehorse, 1990 Preakness Stakes winner, euthanized.
Charlotte Turgeon, 97, American chef and author, influenza.
S. Varalakshmi, 84, Indian actress and singer, complications from a fall.
Lucy Vodden, 46, British inspiration for The Beatles song "Lucy in the Sky with Diamonds", lupus.
Wess, 64, Italian singer, placed third in Eurovision Song Contest 1975.

23
Paul B. Fay, 91, American politician, Acting Secretary of the Navy (1963), Alzheimer's disease.
Gigolo FRH, 26, German-bred dressage horse, four-time Olympic gold medalist, euthanized.
Ertuğrul Osman, 97, Turkish 43rd Head of the Imperial Ottoman Dynasty, lung and kidney failure.
Dennis Pacey, 80, British footballer (Leyton Orient, Millwall), aneurysm.
Stuart Robertson, 65, British-born Canadian journalist and gardener, complications from pneumonia.
Bill Speirs, 57, British trade union leader, after long illness.
George M. Sullivan, 87, American politician, Mayor of Anchorage, Alaska (1967–1981), lung cancer.
Marie Wadley, 102, American co-founder of the Five Civilized Tribes Museum.
Don Yarborough, 83, American politician, Parkinson's disease.

24
Nelly Arcan, 36, Canadian novelist, suicide.
Susan Atkins, 61, American murderer ('Manson Family' member), brain cancer.
Pudhota Chinniah Balaswamy, 80, Indian Bishop of Nellore.
Keith Batchelor, 78, Australian rules footballer (Collingwood, North Melbourne).
Terry Bly, 73, British footballer (Norwich City, Peterborough United), heart attack.
Forrest Church, 61, American Unitarian Universalist minister, author and theologian, esophageal cancer.
Cryptoclearance, 25, American thoroughbred racehorse, complications from colic surgery.
Joseph Satoshi Fukahori, 84, Japanese Bishop of Takamatsu.
Joseph Gurwin, 89, Lithuanian-born American textile manufacturer and philanthropist, heart failure.
Kevork Hovnanian, 86, Iraqi-born American businessman, founder of Hovnanian Enterprises.
Rogers McVaugh, 100, American botanist.
Sir Howard Morrison, 74, New Zealand singer, heart attack.
Emile Norman, 91, American artist, natural causes.
Robert Sahakyants, 59, Armenian animator, complications from heart surgery.
Egon Solymossy, 87, Hungarian Olympic athlete (death announced on this date).
Mimi Weddell, 94, American actress (Student Bodies, The Thomas Crown Affair).
Margo Wilson, 66, Canadian psychologist.

25
István Bujtor, 67, Hungarian actor and director, coccidiosis.
Pierre Falardeau, 62, Canadian film director, cancer.
Alicia de Larrocha, 86, Spanish pianist.
Maria Gulovich Liu, 87, Slovakian resistance member, cancer.
Clifton Maloney, 71, American businessman, husband of U.S. Representative Carolyn B. Maloney, mountaineering accident.
Steeve Nguema Ndong, 37, Gabonese Olympic judoka.
Francis Noel-Baker, 89, British politician, MP for Brentford and Chiswick (1945–1950) and Swindon (1955–1969).
Bob Stupak, 67, American casino owner (Vegas World, Stratosphere Las Vegas), leukemia.
David Will, 72, British vice president of FIFA, former Brechin City F.C. chairman, cancer.

26
Sir John Dyke Acland, 16th Baronet, 70, British aristocrat, traffic collision.
Geoff Barrowcliffe, 77, British footballer (Derby County).
Tony Chua, Filipino sports executive, Barako Bulls team manager, drowning during Tropical Storm Ketsana.
Zygmunt Chychła, 83, Polish boxer, 1952 Olympic gold medalist.
W. I. B. Crealock, 89, British yacht designer.
Amy Farris, 40, American fiddler and singer-songwriter, suicide.
John Hyson, 81, American museum curator and historian.
Paul Medhurst, 55, British-New Zealand cyclist.
Nihat Nikerel, 59, Turkish actor, heart attack.
Alfred Oglesby, 42, American football player (Miami Dolphins).
R. Soeprapto, 85, Indonesian politician, Governor of Jakarta (1982–1987).
David Underdown, 84, British historian, author of definitive work on Pride's Purge.

27
Alimsultan Alkhamatov, 44, Russian politician and official, head of the Khasavyurt region of Dagestan, shot.
John Connell, 69, American artist.
Ivan Dykhovichny, 61, Russian film director, screenwriter, cancer.
Donald Fisher, 81, American businessman, founder of The Gap, cancer.
John Holmes, 57, British rugby league player, cancer.
Henry Hopkins, 81, American curator and museum director, cancer.
Charles Snead Houston, 96, American physician, mountaineer, inventor, author and filmmaker.
Manuel Mandel, 72, Brazilian Olympic rower.
Donal McLaughlin, 102, American architect, designer of the Flag of the United Nations, esophageal cancer.
Brian Redman, 31, American bass player (3 Inches of Blood, Trial), scooter accident.
Dewald Roode, 69, South African academic, fall.
William Safire, 79, American speechwriter and journalist (The New York Times), pancreatic cancer.
Beau Velasco, Australian guitarist (The Death Set).

28
Apostolos, 85, Greek bishop of Kilkis.
René Bliard, 76, French footballer (Stade Reims).
Annie Butler, 112, British supercentenarian.
Guillermo Endara, 73, Panamanian politician, President (1989–1994).
Ulf Larsson, 53, Swedish actor, stage director and revue artist.
Best Ogedegbe, 55, Nigerian footballer, complications from surgery.
Luis Sánchez-Moreno Lira, 83, Peruvian archbishop Emeritus of Arequipa.
Don Thompson, 85, American baseball player (Brooklyn Dodgers).

29
Micheline Beauchemin, 79, Canadian tapestry and textile artist.
Henry Bellmon, 88, American Governor of Oklahoma (1963–1967; 1987–1991), U.S. Senator (1969–1981), Parkinson's disease.
Ebony Dickinson, 32, American basketball player, breast cancer.
Gunnar Haugan, 84, Norwegian character actor.
Julian Hope, 2nd Baron Glendevon, 59, British opera producer, cancer.
Margo Johns, 90, British actress.
Greg Ladanyi, 57, American record producer and recording engineer, complications from a fall.
Jean Ladd, 86, American baseball player (AAGPBL).
Ray Nettles, 60, American-born Canadian football player (BC Lions), cancer.
John L. Pollock, 69, American philosopher.
Pavel Popovich, 78, Ukrainian-born Soviet cosmonaut.
Ed Sherman, 97, American football coach (Muskingum College).
Nick Strutt, 62, British country musician.
Sperantza Vrana, 81, Greek film actress, singer and writer, heart attack.
Vladimir Yakovlev, 79, Soviet Olympic sailor.

30
Sir Alastair Aird, 78, British Royal courtier.
Pentti Airikkala, 64, Finnish rally driver, prostate cancer.
Rafael Arozarena, 86, Spanish writer and poet.
Robert S. Baker, 93, British film and television producer (The Saint, The Persuaders!).
John Couey, 51, American murderer, killer of Jessica Lunsford (the inspiration for Jessica's Law), prostate cancer.
Lee Fletcher, 43, American politician, Chief of staff of U.S. Representative John Cooksey, talk radio host (KBYO-FM), cancer.
Roland La Starza, 82, American actor and professional boxer.
Raúl Magaña, 69, Salvadoran footballer and manager, gastric cancer.
Byron Palmer, 89, American actor, natural causes.
Rao Birender Singh, 88, Indian politician, Chief Minister of Haryana (1967), cardiac arrest.
Victor Van Schil, 69, Belgian cyclist.

References

2009-09
 09